Meroo Meadow is a suburb in the City of Shoalhaven in New South Wales, Australia. It lies on the Princes Highway about 33 km southwest of Kiama and 9 km north of Nowra.

References

City of Shoalhaven